Weightlifting was part of the 1975 National Games of China held in Beijing. Only men competed in eight bodyweight categories which mostly mirrored the international standard at the time. The Chinese Weightlifting Association became a member federation of the IWF earlier in 1974.

The competition program at the National Games mirrors that of the Olympic Games as only medals for the total achieved are awarded, but not for individual lifts in either the snatch or clean and jerk. Likewise an athlete failing to register a snatch result cannot advance to the clean and jerk.

Medal summary

Men

Medal table

References
Archived results of the 1975 Games 

1975 in weightlifting
1975
Weight